The women's lightweight (60 kilograms) event at the 2010 Asian Games took place from 21 to 26 November 2010 at Lingnan Mingzhu Gymnasium, Foshan, China.

Like all Asian Games boxing events, the competition was a straight single-elimination tournament. 

A total of 14 women from 14 countries competed in this event, limited to fighters whose body weight was less than 60 kilograms. Dong Cheng of China won the gold medal. She beat Tassamalee Thongjan of Thailand 13–4 in the final bout in Foshan Gymnasium. Yun Kum-ju and Saida Khassenova shared the bronze medal.

Schedule
All times are China Standard Time (UTC+08:00)

Results 
Legend
RSC — Won by referee stop contest
RSCI — Won by referee stop contest injury

References

External links
Official website

Women's 60